Juice Wrld: Into the Abyss  is a 2021 documentary film, directed by Tommy Oliver. Focusing on the life and death of American rapper and singer Juice Wrld, the documentary is the sixth and final part of the HBO Max documentary series Music Box. It premiered at the AFI Fest on November 12, 2021, where it won the AFI Fest Documentary Audience Award, and it officially debuted on December 16, 2021, with an exclusive preview at the Juice WRLD Day event held at Chicago's United Center on December 9.

Shot, edited, and produced by Oliver, the documentary contains footage from Juice's last years, and contains appearances from numerous friends and family of his, including his protégé The Kid Laroi, girlfriend Ally Lotti, and manager Lil Bibby. It also features numerous frequent collaborators of Juice's, including rappers Ski Mask the Slump God, Polo G, and G Herbo, producers Benny Blanco, Rex Kudo, and Hit-Boy, and music video director Cole Bennett.

The documentary's release was preceded by the release of Juice's fourth studio album and second to be released posthumously, Fighting Demons. The first single from the album, "Already Dead", was released to streaming services on November 12, 2021. The album was officially released by Juice's labels, Grade A and Interscope Records on December 10, 2021.

The film received mostly positive reviews from critics. Conversely, film critic Steve Pulaski of Influx Magazine gave the film a negative review, saying, "Into the Abyss is perhaps the grimiest documentary that could be made about the late Chicago legend. Sloppy editing is one thing, but to show intimate footage of the 21-year-old artist’s spiral into addiction in such an uncritical way feels especially cruel."

Starring
All star as themselves.

 Juice Wrld (archival footage)
 Ally Lotti
 Cole Bennett
 Benny Blanco
 DJ Scheme
 G Herbo
 iLoveMakonnen
 The Kid Laroi
 Lil Bibby
 Polo G
 Rex Kudo
 Ski Mask the Slump God
 D-Savage

See also
 Everybody's Everything (film)
 Look at Me (2022 film)

References

Documentary films about hip hop music and musicians
2021 documentary films
2021 films
American documentary films
2020s English-language films
2020s American films